Trust is a studio album by Saga, their seventeenth album of new material. It is the first album to feature former Helix drummer Brian Doerner on drums.

Track listing

Personnel
 Michael Sadler: Vocals
 Ian Crichton: Guitars
 Jim Crichton: Bass, keyboards
 Jim Gilmour: Keyboards, vocals
 Brian Doerner: Drums

Production
 All songs recorded & engineered by Saga, Geoff Kent, Mark Scola
 All songs produced by Saga. Co-produced by Geoff Kent
 Mastered by Peter van't Riet
 Artwork by Balázs Pápay

References

2006 albums
Saga (band) albums
SPV/Steamhammer albums
Inside Out Music albums